Histioea paulina is a moth of the subfamily Arctiinae. It was described by Francis Walker in 1866. It is found in São Paulo, Brazil.

References

 

Arctiinae
Moths described in 1866